Drug Lords is a 2018 American docu-series exploring real-life drug-dealing cartels and kingpins such as Pablo Escobar, the Cali Cartel, Frank Lucas and the Pettingill family.

Premise
Drug Lords explores real-life drug-dealing cartels and kingpins such as Pablo Escobar, the Cali Cartel, Frank Lucas and the Pettingill Clan by interviews from officers, gang members and journalists as well as dramatized re-enactments of certain events.

Cast
 Justin van Dijk
 Quinn Dalton
 Jordan Lawson
 Razor Rocco Rizzotti
 Winter Dunn

Episodes

Season 1 (2018)

Season 2 (2018)

Release
The series was released on January 19, 2018 on Netflix streaming.

References

External links
 
 
 

2018 American television series debuts
2010s American documentary television series
English-language Netflix original programming
Netflix original documentary television series
Works about Mexican drug cartels
Works about Colombian drug cartels